Vitaliy Vasylyovych Mandzyuk (born 24 January 1986 in Vilino, Crimea) is a retired Ukrainian football defender who last played for Dnipro Dnipropetrovsk in the Ukrainian Premier League. Previously he played for Dynamo Kyiv and was on loan to Arsenal Kyiv. He is a former player for the Ukraine national under-21 football team having made 12 appearances and the senior team. He is younger brother of the player of Oleksandr Mandzyuk. Currently he works as fitness coach for Ukrainian Premier League club Kolos Kovalivka.

Career

Dynamo Kyiv
Mandzyuk started his professional football career with Dynamo Kyiv in 2004. Going into the 2007–08 season, Mandzyuk got injured, having to undergo a surgery. This prevented from him playing for the rest of the year 2007, but he recovered to play for the second half of the season.

In July 2008, Mandzyuk was loaned off to Arsenal Kyiv along with teammate Denys Oliynyk.

Dnipro Dnipropetrovsk
On 23 December 2009, Mandzyuk was sold to Dnipro for an undisclosed fee.

International career
Mandzyuk was a regular member of the Ukraine national under-21 football team, and captained it on numerous occasions.  On 23 August 2007, Mandzyuk scored the third goal in a friendly match victory against Moldova.

Mandzyuk was called up to the senior team of Ukraine for the friendly against Cyprus on 6 February 2008. He was called up along with fellow club member Fedoriv by manager Oleksiy Mykhailychenko after the injury of mainstream defenders Dmytro Chyhrynskyi and Nesmachnyi.

References

Honors
UEFA Europa League (1) runner-up 2014–15

External links
 Player profile at the Dynamo Kyiv Official Website 
 Information by Vitaliy Mandzyuk at arsenal-kiev.com.ua
 Football Federation of Ukraine Profile 

1986 births
Living people
People from Bakhchysarai Raion
Ukrainian footballers
Ukraine international footballers
Ukrainian Premier League players
FC Dynamo Kyiv players
FC Dynamo-2 Kyiv players
FC Dynamo-3 Kyiv players
FC Arsenal Kyiv players
FC Dnipro players
Association football defenders